Esteban Salles (born 2 March 1994) is a French professional footballer who plays for Grenoble as a goalkeeper.

Career
Salles is a youth exponent from Tours. He made his Ligue 2 debut at 1 August 2014 against US Créteil-Lusitanos in a 4–2 home win.

References

1994 births
Living people
Association football goalkeepers
French footballers
Tours FC players
Trélissac FC players
Les Herbiers VF players
Grenoble Foot 38 players
Ligue 2 players
Championnat National players
People from Oloron-Sainte-Marie
Footballers from Nouvelle-Aquitaine
Sportspeople from Pyrénées-Atlantiques